Sergio Martínez vs. Darren Barker was a middleweight fight for The Ring title. The fight took place in Boardwalk Hall, Atlantic City, New Jersey, United States on October 1, 2011 Barker, the European champion, was certainly not the first choice for Martínez, various other potential opponents turned down overtures for a bout against him. Promoter Lou DiBella offered the fight with Martínez to titleholders Julio Cesar Chavez Jr. and Daniel Geale as well as junior middleweight titlist Miguel Cotto and Paul Williams, for a rubber match. Martínez said he was willing to face Cotto at middleweight or drop down to junior middleweight to fight him, but Cotto continued to ignore the fight.

Background

Martínez 

Martínez won two world titles in April 2010 with a unanimous decision over Kelly Pavlik. Martínez made his first defense in spectacular fashion on Paul Williams by knocking him unconscious with one punch. In his second defense, Martínez laid a beating on junior middleweight titlist Sergiy Dzinziruk, HBO's preferred opponent who moved up in weight for the opportunity. Martínez dropped him five times en route to a lopsided eighth-round knockout on March 12. And because Martínez faced Dzinziruk instead of mandatory challenger Sebastian Zbik (whom HBO rejected for Martínez but accepted for Chavez), the WBC stripped Martínez and elevated Zbik to its titleholder. Zbik then lost the belt to Chavez on June 4 by majority decision.

Barker 

Barker won the vacant EBU middleweight title with a unanimous decision win over France's Affif Belghecham on April 9, 2010. However, he was then the victim of a cowardly street attack in June 2010 after he tried to prevent a scuffle. This event, coupled with a chronic hip-problem, left him inactive for over a year as he recovered from the assault and underwent hip surgery. Barker returned to ring on April 30, 2011, once again winning the vacant EBU middleweight crown with a hard-fought unanimous decision victory over Italy's Domenico Spada.

Undercard

Televised 
Middleweight bout:  Andy Lee vs.  Brian Vera
Lee defeated Vera via unanimous Decision (99-90, 98-91, 99-90)

Preliminary card 
Light Heavyweight bout:  Isaac Chilemba vs.  Jameson Bostic
Chilemba defeated Bostic via Technical Knockout at 1:48 of the second round.

Super Middleweight bout:  Sean Monaghan vs.  Kentrell Claiborne
Monaghan defeated Claiborne via Technical Knockout at 0:54 of the fourth round.

Heavyweight bout:  Magomed Abdusalamov vs.  Kevin Burnett
Abdusalamov defeated Burnett via Technical Knockout at 1:18 of the first round.

Super Welterweight bout:  Steve Martínez vs.  Jay Krupp
Martínez defeated Krupp via Technical Knockout at 1:57 of the fifth round.

Super Middleweight bout:  J'Leon Love vs.  Eddie Hunter
Love defeated Hunter via unanimous Decision (60-53, 60-54, 60-54)

Super Welterweight bout:  Boyd Melson vs.  Russ Niggemyer
Melson defeated Niggemyer via unanimous Decision (59-55, 60-54, 60-53)

Middleweight bout:  Israel Duffus vs.  Troy Artis
Artis defeated Duffus via Technical Knockout at 2:03 of the third round.

Super Welterweight bout:  Kevin Rooney Jr vs.  Danny Lugo
Lugo defeated Rooney via unanimous Decision (37-39, 37-39, 37-39)

Result 
Martínez defeated Barker via Knockout at 1:29 of the eleventh round. Barker had some success early in the fight, landing some jabs and a few straight rights that made Martínez's nose to bleed in the fourth round. But from the fifth round on, Martínez dominated the fight behind three- and four-punch flurries that left Barker covering up for most of the bout.

Through 10 rounds, judges Lynn Carter (96-94), Victor Loughlin (97-94) and Alejandro Roche (99-91) all had Martínez ahead.

Reported fight earnings 

Sergio Martínez  $1,500,000 vs. Darren Barker ($400,000)

International broadcasting

References

External links 
HBO WCB – Oct.1 2011
The Buzz: Martínez vs. Barker Press Conference (HBO)
Martínez vs. Barker Official Fight Card from BoxRec

2011 in boxing
2011 in sports in New Jersey
Boxing on HBO
October 2011 sports events in the United States
Boxing matches at Boardwalk Hall